The Church of Saint Ahudemmeh, also known as the Green Church, was a Syriac Orthodox church in Tikrit, Iraq. The church was destroyed by Islamic State militants on 25 September 2014.

History
The church was constructed by Denha II, Maphrian of the East, in 700 AD, and was dedicated to Saint Ahudemmeh. Denha II and his successors John II, Daniel, Thomas I, and Baselios III, were buried in the church. Dinkha of Tikrit debated theology and philosophy with Al-Masudi at the church in 925.

In 1089, the church was looted and destroyed by the governor of Tikrit, but was restored in 1112. Christians took refuge in the church during the Mongol invasion of Iraq in 1258, where they were slaughtered and few escaped.

The church was excavated by the Iraqi Archaeological Service in the 1990s, and several coffins were discovered, including that of Anaseous, Bishop of Tikrit. In 2000, Saddam Hussein had the church restored due to its dilapidated condition. On 25 September 2014, the church was destroyed by Islamic State militants with improvised explosive devices.

References

Bibliography

Churches destroyed by Muslims
Persecution of Christians in Iraq
Islamist attacks on churches
Destroyed churches in Iraq
Buildings and structures demolished in 2014
Buildings and structures destroyed by ISIL
Syriac Orthodox churches in Iraq
Tikrit